Liga Futbol Inc. is a Filipino corporation based in Pasig, Metro Manila responsible for managing the Philippines Football League (PFL), the top-flight professional national football league in the Philippines. It was created with the aim to professionalize the PFL and also manages the Copa Paulino Alcantara, the country's domestic cup.

The company was established by the Philippine Football Federation and is meant to operate, manage, and stage competitions sanctioned by the national football federation. The LFI adopted its own logo on 23 April 2018.

References

Philippines Football League
Football governing bodies in the Philippines
Philippine Football Federation